María Isabel Martínez de Murguía Embarba (born 16 October 1967 in Madrid) is a former field hockey player from Spain. She was a member of the Women's National Team that surprisingly won the gold medal at the 1992 Summer Olympics on home soil (Barcelona)

References

External links
 
 

1967 births
Living people
Spanish female field hockey players
Female field hockey goalkeepers
Olympic field hockey players of Spain
Field hockey players at the 1992 Summer Olympics
Olympic gold medalists for Spain
Field hockey players from Madrid
Olympic medalists in field hockey
Medalists at the 1992 Summer Olympics
20th-century Spanish women